American actress Demi Moore made her film debut in 1981 then appeared on the soap opera General Hospital (1982–1984) and subsequently gained recognition as a member of the Brat Pack with roles in Blame It on Rio (1984), St. Elmo's Fire (1985), and About Last Night... (1986). She had her breakthrough for her starring role in Ghost (1990), the highest-grossing film of that year. Her performance was praised and earned her a Golden Globe nomination. She had further box-office success in the early 1990s, with the films A Few Good Men (1992), Indecent Proposal (1993), and Disclosure (1994).

In 1996, Moore became the highest-paid actress in film history when she received an unprecedented $12.5 million to star in Striptease. She had starring roles in the films The Scarlet Letter (1995), The Juror (1996) and G.I. Jane (1997), all of which were commercially unsuccessful and contributed to a downturn in her career. Her career has since had a resurgence with supporting roles in such films as Charlie's Angels: Full Throttle (2003), Bobby (2006), Mr. Brooks (2007), Margin Call (2011), and Rough Night (2017).

Film

Television

Music videos

Director

References

External links

Actress filmographies
American filmographies